Green & Wicks was an architectural firm of Buffalo, New York.

Practice
Edward Brodhead Green was an 1878 graduate of Cornell University's College of Architecture, and designed a number of buildings which made up Cornell's Agriculture Quadrangle, including Bailey Hall (1912), Caldwell Hall (1913), the Computing and Communications Center (1912, originally known as Comstock Hall), Fernow Hall (1915), and the original Roberts Hall (1906, demolished 1990).

Green's best-known commissions were designed with his partner William Sydney Wicks (1854–1917), as Green & Wicks.  The firm's chronology is:

1884: Green & Wicks founded
1917: Renamed E.B. Green & Son
1933: Renamed E. B Green after his son's death
1936: Renamed Green & James
1945: Renamed Green, James & Meadows
1950: Renamed James & Meadows after Green's death
1952: Renamed James, Meadows & Howard
1971: Firm dissolved

The firm's records survive in the library collections of the Buffalo History Museum.

A number of their works are listed on the U.S. National Register of Historic Places.

Projects

Notable works of the Green & Wicks architectural firm include:
Albright-Knox Art Gallery
Albright Memorial Building, N. Washington Ave. and Vine St. Scranton, PA (Green & Wicks), NRHP-listed
American Radiator Company Factory Complex, Buffalo, NY, NRHP-listed
 Bailey Hall, Cornell University, 1912, NRHP-listed
Buffalo Crematorium Company, 901 W Delavan Ave, Buffalo, NY
Birge-Horton House, 477 Delaware Ave. Buffalo, NY (Green and Wicks), NRHP-listed
Brick Presbyterian Church, 6 Church St. Perry, NY (Green & Wicks), NRHP-listed
Brost Building (c. 1935) in the Broadway Historic District, Lancaster, New York
Buffalo Athletic Club
Buffalo Savings Bank Building
Caldwell Hall, Cornell University campus Ithaca, NY (Green & Wicks), NRHP-listed
Charles W. Goodyear House, Buffalo, NY
Dayton Art Institute, Dayton, Ohio
Dun Building, 110 Pearl Street, Buffalo, NY
D.S. Morgan building, (destroyed), Buffalo, NY
Erie County Holding Center
Fernow Hall, Cornell University campus Ithaca, NY (Green & Wicks), NRHP-listed
Fidelity Trust Building, now known as "Swan Tower", 284 Main Street, Buffalo, NY
Kibler High School, 284 Main St., Tonawanda, New York
Marine National Bank, 1913
Market Arcade Building, 617 Main St, Buffalo, NY
Old West End District, Roughly bounded by Delaware, Collingwood, and Glenwood Aves. and Grove Pl. Toledo, OH (Green & Wicks), NRHP-listed
Ransom School "Pagoda", 3575 Main Hwy. Miami, FL (Greene & Wicks), NRHP-listed
South Park High School
Stephen Merrell Clement House, 1913, 786 Delaware Ave, Buffalo, NY, Extant as the Red Cross Building
St. Vincent's Female Orphan Asylum, 1313 Main St. Buffalo, NY
University Club Building (Buffalo)
Twentieth Century Club (Buffalo, New York)
Watson-Curtze Mansion, 356 W. 6th St. Erie, PA (Green & Wicks), NRHP-listed
Wing Hall, Cornell University campus Ithaca, NY (Green & Wicks), NRHP-listed
Young Men's Christian Association Central Building, 45 W. Mohawk St. Buffalo, NY (Green & Wicks), NRHP-listed

Notable works of the E.B. Green and Sons architectural firm include:
Abbot Hall / Lockwood Memorial Library, University at Buffalo (South Campus), 1933
Crosby Hall, University at Buffalo (South Campus), 1931
Electric Tower, 535 Washington St. Buffalo, NY, NRHP-listed
Michael J. Dillon Memorial United States Courthouse, 68 Court Street, Buffalo NY
Garret Club, 91 Cleveland Ave., Buffalo, NY, 1929

Notable works of the Green & James architectural firm include:
Buffalo Memorial Auditorium, (destroyed), Buffalo NY
Parker Hall, University at Buffalo (South Campus), 1945

Gallery

See also
 Esenwein & Johnson

References

External links
E.B. Green at www.buffaloah.com
Green & Wicks: A bibliography courtesy of the Buffalo History Museum.

Defunct architecture firms based in New York (state)
Architects from Buffalo, New York
Companies based in Buffalo, New York
Design companies established in 1884
1884 establishments in New York (state)
Design companies disestablished in 1971
1971 disestablishments in New York (state)
Historicist architects